Edward Follansbee Noyes (October 3, 1832September 4, 1890) was a Republican politician from Ohio. Noyes served as the 30th governor of Ohio.

Biography
Noyes was born in Haverhill, Massachusetts. He was orphaned at the age of three and was raised in New Hampshire by his grandfather and a guardian. At the age of thirteen, he was apprenticed to the printer of The Morning Star, a religious newspaper published in Dover, New Hampshire. He remained an apprentice for over four years until he left to enter an academy in Kingston, New Hampshire. He graduated from Dartmouth College in 1857 (4th in a class of 57 students), then moved to Cincinnati, Ohio, and attended the Cincinnati Law School.

Noyes served in the Union Army during the Civil War. He helped organize the 39th Ohio Infantry, and was rewarded with a commission as its first major on July 27, 1861. Within a few months, he had become the regiment's colonel.

Noyes married Margaret W. Proctor at Kingston, New Hampshire in February, 1863, while on leave from the army.

He was severely wounded in his ankle in a skirmish at Ruff's Mill on July 4, 1864, during the Atlanta Campaign and, as a result, had his left leg amputated. Three months later, Maj. Gen. Joseph Hooker assigned Noyes, who was still recuperating and using crutches, to the command of Camp Dennison near Cincinnati, breveted him as a brigadier general. Noyes commanded the post until April 22, 1865, when he resigned to become city solicitor.

He was elected in October 1866 as the probate judge of Hamilton County.

He was elected to the governorship in 1871, besting another former Union Army officer, Col. George W. McCook, by more than twenty thousand votes. He served one two-year term between 1872–74, pushing for stricter coal mine inspection laws and promoting fish conservation. He lost re-election in 1873 by 817 votes, 50.1% - 49.9%.

In 1874, he was appointed an Ohio Commissioner of the Centennial Exposition in Philadelphia

He later served as Rutherford B. Hayes's Minister to France from 1877–81, a patronage reward for his strong support of his fellow Buckeye soldier during Hayes' presidential campaign.

He died on September 4, 1890 in Cincinnati, Ohio. He was buried in Spring Grove Cemetery in Cincinnati, Ohio.

Notes

References
Ohio Governors - bio of Noyes
Ohio Historical Society webpage for Governor Noyes

External links

 

1832 births
1890 deaths
Union Army generals
People of Ohio in the American Civil War
Republican Party governors of Ohio
Ambassadors of the United States to France
Politicians from Haverhill, Massachusetts
Politicians from Cincinnati
Burials at Spring Grove Cemetery
Dartmouth College alumni
University of Cincinnati College of Law alumni
Judges of the Superior Court of Cincinnati
19th-century American diplomats
American amputees
American politicians with disabilities
19th-century American judges
19th-century American politicians
Military personnel from Massachusetts